Virgin1 Presents.... is an animated music show consisting of 13 hour-long programmes which contain a mixture of music performance and artist interviews shot at venues across the UK. The show was originally going to be called Live in Concert however, this changed once Virgin1 acquired the rights. Mysteriously, the show disappeared from Virgin1's schedules in February 2008.

References

2007 British television series debuts
2008 British television series endings
Channel One (British and Irish TV channel) original programming